Greatest Love Songs may refer to:
 Greatest Love Songs (Joe Cocker album), a 2003 compilation album by Joe Cocker
 Greatest Love Songs (Frank Sinatra album), a 2002 compilation album by American singer Frank Sinatra
 Greatest Love Songs Vol. 666, the debut album by Finnish band Him
 The Greatest Love Songs of All Time, a 2010 album by Barry Manilow